Xidian may refer to:

 Xidian, Zhejiang, a town in Ninghai County, Zhejiang, China
 Xidian University, a university in Xi'an, Shaanxi, China